Elkton is an unincorporated community located in central Elkrun Township, Columbiana County, Ohio, United States. It lies along State Route 154 at the confluence of Elk Run and the Little Beaver Creek and has the ZIP code 44415. It is home to the Federal Correctional Institution, Elkton, a male low-security federal prison. Additionally, Elkton is home to one of the shortest covered bridges in the United States, the Church Hill Road Covered Bridge.

History

Elkton was platted in 1835. The community derives its name from nearby Elk Run creek. A post office called Elkton has been in operation since 1838. The community thrived due to its location on the Sandy and Beaver Canal, but was in decline by the late 1840s when the canal became unprofitable and was suspended.

References

Unincorporated communities in Columbiana County, Ohio
1835 establishments in Ohio
Populated places established in 1835
Unincorporated communities in Ohio